Ban Fang may refer to:
Ban Fang, a village in Ban Pong, Cambodia
Amphoe Ban Fang, a district in Thailand
 Ban Fang, Kaset Wisai - Roi Et Province, Thailand
 Ban Fang, Kranuan - Khon Kaen Province, Thailand
 Ban Fang, Sakhrai - Nong Khai Province, Thailand